The Constitution of the Confederate States was the supreme law of the Confederate States of America. It was adopted on March 11, 1861, and was in effect from February 22, 1862, to the conclusion of the American Civil War (May 1865). The Confederacy also operated under a Provisional Constitution from February 8, 1861, to February 22, 1862. The original Provisional Constitution is located at the American Civil War Museum in Richmond, Virginia, and differs slightly from the version later adopted. The final, handwritten Constitution is located in the Hargrett Rare Book and Manuscript Library at the University of Georgia.  Most of its provisions are word-for-word duplicates from the United States Constitution; however, there are crucial differences between the two documents in tone and legal content, primarily regarding slavery.

Comparison with U.S. Constitution
The preambles of both the U.S. and the Confederate Constitutions have some similarities, but it seems that the Confederate Constitution authors set out to give a different feel to the new preamble. Both preambles are provided here. The bold text shows the differences between them. The Confederate Constitution's preamble includes references to God, a perpetual government, and the sovereignty and the independence of each state.
The Preamble to the U.S. Constitution: "We the People of the United States, in Order to form a more perfect Union, establish Justice, insure domestic Tranquility, provide for the common defence, promote the general Welfare, and secure the Blessings of Liberty to ourselves and our Posterity, do ordain and establish this Constitution for the United States of America."
The Preamble to the Confederate Constitution: "We, the people of the Confederate States, each state acting in its sovereign and independent character, in order to form a permanent federal government, establish justice, insure domestic tranquillity, and secure the blessings of liberty to ourselves and our posterity — invoking the favor and guidance of Almighty God — do ordain and establish this Constitution for the Confederate States of America."

Article summaries
The Confederate Constitution followed the U.S. Constitution for the most part in the main body of the text but with some changes:

Article I differences 
Amended Article I Section 2(1) to prohibit persons "of foreign birth" who were "not a citizen of the Confederate States" from voting "for any officer, civil or political, State or Federal."
Article I Section 2(3) is essentially the same, and the clause still counts only "three-fifths of all slaves" for the population total of each state, just as it did in the US with the Three-Fifths Compromise: "The number of Representatives shall not exceed one for every fifty thousand". while in the U.S. Constitution "The Number of Representatives shall not exceed one for every thirty Thousand." A proposed Amendment to the U.S. Constitution which had been awaiting ratification by the states would have changed the maximum number of representatives to one for every fifty thousand.
Amended Article I Section 2(5) to allow the state legislatures to impeach federal officials who live and work only within their state with a two-thirds vote of both houses of the state legislature.
Concerning the appointment of Senators, Article I Section 3(1) adds "at the regular session next immediately preceding the commencement of the term of service." The state legislature, which then was responsible for the appointment of senators, had to wait until the seat was vacant.
Article I Section 4(1) deals with elections and adds "subject to the provisions of this Constitution" to the U.S. Constitution Clause. That meant that each state legislature was free to make its own decision except if the constitution laid out other rules. The aforementioned Article I Section 2(1) and Article I Section 3(1) clauses would fall into that category.
Amended Article I Section 6(2) to allow the House of Representatives and the Senate the ability to grant seats to the heads of each executive department to discuss issues involving their departments with Congress. The clause is the same as the one from the U.S. Constitution and adds:

Amended Article I Section 7(2) to provide the President of the Confederate States of America with a line-item veto but also required any bill in which the president used the veto in to be resubmitted to both houses for a possible override vote by two thirds of both houses.
 In an attempt to prevent the Confederate Congress from protecting industry, the framers added to Article I Section 8(1):

The phrase "general Welfare" was dropped from the Confederate Clause as well.

Article I Section 8(3) added quite a bit to the U.S. Constitution in an attempt to block the Confederate Congress from passing laws to "facilitate commerce," with some exceptions allowing for safety and improvement to waterways.
Article I Section 8 of the U.S. Constitution.

Article I Section 8(3) of the Confederate Constitution.

There are changes and additions to Article 1 Section 9 Clauses (1), (2), and (4) that are covered in the Slavery section below.
 The first twelve amendments to the U.S. Constitution, including the Bill of Rights, were directly incorporated into the Confederate Constitution. That was done primarily in Article I Section 9  of the Confederate Constitution, with the first eight amendments to the U.S. Constitution becoming clauses (12) to (19).
In addition to were three altogether-new clauses in the Confederate Constitution for Article I, Section 9.
Article I, Section 9(9)

Article I, Section 9(10)

Amendments I through VIII are contained, in the same order, in Article I, Section 9(12) through Article I, Section 9(19) (the remainder of the US Bill of Rights is in Article VI).
Article I, Section 9(20) was added to limit new bills to only one subject presented.

Then in Section 10:
 Article I Section 10(3): Confederate States did not have the ability to tax ships and negotiate treaties concerning waterways with other States without the consent of Congress. That clause limited the Confederate States in their ability to keep troops or to engage in war, but they would have the ability to enter compacts for the improvement of shared rivers.

Article II 
The President of the Confederate States of America is to be elected by electors, chosen by the individual states, for a single six-year term, rather than a then-unlimited number of four-year terms. Article 2 Section 1(1) reads as: "The executive power shall be vested in a President of the Confederate States of America. He and the Vice President shall hold their offices for the term of six years; but the President shall not be re-eligible."
 Amendment XII of the U.S. Constitution is added here as Article II Section 1(3), (4), and (5)
 Article II Section 1(7) of the Confederate Constitution required candidates for the President of the Confederacy to have resided "within the limits of the Confederate States" for 14 years.
Changes to Article III
 Article III Section 2(1) of the Confederate Constitution combines the first clause of Article III Section 1 in the U.S. Constitution with Amendment XI. The phrase "citizens of the same state" is left out and "and foreign states, citizens or subjects; but no state shall be sued by a citizen or subject of any foreign state" is added in the Confederate Constitution.
Changes to Article IV
There were changes and additions to Article IV Section 2(1) and Article IV Section 3(3), which are covered in the Slavery section below.
Article IV Section 3(1) required a two-thirds of both houses of Congress vote for a new state to join the Confederacy.

Changes to Article V
 The Confederate Congress, unlike in the U.S. Constitution, could not propose amendments. Instead, amendments had to be proposed by constitutional conventions in at least three states. The Confederate Constitution also clarified an ambiguity in the U.S. Constitution's Article V by declaring that a national convention could propose only amendments that were suggested by state conventions, as opposed to having the authority to amend the entire Constitution.  The process of amendment became easier (Article V Section 1(1)) by requiring only two thirds of the states to ratify, rather than three fourths.
Changes to Article VI
The Confederate Constitution added a clause to aid with the transition from the provisional government.

 Amendments IX and X of the U.S. Constitution were added here as Article VI Section 1(5), and (6)
Changes to Article VII
Article VII Section 1(2), with instructions for electing permanent officials after the ratification of the Confederate Constitution, was added.

Differences by subject

Slavery
There were several major differences between the constitutions concerning slavery.

Whereas the original U.S. Constitution did not use the word "slavery" or the term "Negro Slaves" but instead used "Person[s] held to Service or Labour," which included whites and Native Americans in indentured servitude, the Confederate Constitution addresses the legality of slavery directly and by name.
Though Article I, Section 9(1), of both constitutions are quite similar in banning the importation of slaves from foreign nations, the Confederate Constitution permitted the Confederate States to import slaves from the United States and specified the "African race" as the subject. The importation of slaves into the United States, including the South, had been illegal since 1808.

While the U.S. Constitution reads

The Confederate Constitution then added a clause that gave Congress the power to prohibit the importation of slaves from any non-Confederate state.

While the U.S. Constitution has a clause that states "No bill of attainder or ex post facto law shall be passed," the Confederate Constitution also added a phrase that explicitly protected slavery.

The U.S. Constitution states in Article IV, Section 2, "The Citizens of each State shall be entitled to all Privileges and Immunities of Citizens in the several States." The Confederate Constitution added that a state government could not prohibit the rights of slave owners traveling or visiting from a different state with their slaves.

The Confederate Constitution added a clause about the question of slavery in the territories, the key constitutional debate of the 1860 election, by explicitly stating slavery to be legally protected in the territories.

States' rights
The Confederate Constitution's preamble included the phrase "each State acting in its sovereign and independent character," which focused the new constitution on the rights of the individual states.
The Preamble to the Confederate Constitution, began, "We, the people of the Confederate States, each State acting in its sovereign and independent character...."

States of the Confederacy gained several rights that states of the Union do not have, such as the right to impeach federal judges and other federal officers if they worked or lived solely in their state.

The Confederate Constitution omitted the phrase "emit Bills of Credit" from Article 1 Section 10 of the U.S. Constitution, which denied the states the right to issue such bills of credit.

U.S. Constitution's Article I Section 10 including the included "emit Bills of Credit."

The Confederate Constitution enabled states to tax ships by omitting the phrase from the U.S. Constitution that prohibits it.

The U.S. Constitution reads:

The ability to tax ships to raise revenue for the Confederate States is reinforced in Article 1 Section 10(3).

Also in Article I Section 10(3), the Confederate States had the power to make treaties between one another concerning waterways.

The Confederate States lost a few rights that the Union states retained.

States lost the right to determine if foreigners can vote in their states: Article I Section 2(1) as mentioned above.
States also lost the ability to restrict the rights of traveling and sojourning slave owners: Article IV Section 2(1) as mentioned above. (Many Southerners were already of the opinion that the U.S. Constitution already protected the rights of sojourning and traveling slave owners and that the Confederate Constitution merely made it explicit.)
The Confederate Congress could determine taxes between states.

The Confederate Constitution contained many of the phrases and clauses that had led to disagreement among US states, including a Supremacy Clause, a Commerce Clause, and a Necessary and Proper Clause. The Supremacy Clause and the Necessary and Proper Clause are nearly identical in both constitutions.
The Commerce Clause differed as follows in that the Confederate Congress was prevented from passing laws to "facilitate commerce," as is shown above.

Signers
The signers and the states they represented were:

Howell Cobb, President of the Congress
South Carolina: R. Barnwell Rhett, C. G. Memminger, Wm. Porcher Miles, James Chesnut, Jr., R. W. Barnwell, William W. Boyce, Laurence Keitt, T. J. Withers
Georgia: R. Toombs, Francis S. Bartow, Martin J. Crawford, Alexander H. Stephens, Benjamin H. Hill, Thos. R. R. Cobb, E. A. Nisbet, Augustus R. Wright, A. H. Kenan
Florida: Jackson Morton, J. Patton Anderson, Jas. B. Owens
Alabama: Richard W. Walker, Robt. H. Smith, Colin J. McRae, William P. Chilton, Stephen F. Hale, David P. Lewis, Tho. Fearn, Jno. Gill Shorter, J. L. M. Curry
Mississippi: Alex. M. Clayton, James T. Harrison, William S. Barry, W. S. Wilson, Walker Brooke, W. P. Harris, J. A. P. Campbell
Louisiana: John Perkins Jr., Alex. de Clouet, C. M. Conrad, Duncan F. Kenner, Henry Marshall, Edward Sparrow
Texas: John Hemphill, Thomas N. Waul, John H. Reagan, Williamson S. Oldham, Louis T. Wigfall, John Gregg, William Beck Ochiltree

Ratification

Congress began to move for ratification of the Confederate States Constitution on March 11, 1861:

Judicial review
Although the Confederate States Supreme Court was never constituted, the supreme courts of the various Confederate states issued numerous decisions interpreting the Confederate Constitution.  Unsurprisingly, since the Confederate Constitution was based on the United States Constitution, the Confederate State Supreme Courts often used United States Supreme Court precedents. The jurisprudence of the Marshall Court thus influenced the interpretation of the Confederate Constitution.  The state courts repeatedly upheld robust powers of the Confederate Congress, especially on matters of military necessity.

Analysis

Contemporary historians overwhelmingly agree that secession was motivated by the preservation of slavery. There were numerous causes for secession, but the preservation and the expansion of slavery were easily the most important of them. The confusion may come from blending the causes of secession with the causes of the war, which are separate but related issues. (Lincoln entered a military conflict not to free the slaves but to put down a rebellion.) According to the historian Kenneth M. Stampp, each side supported states' rights or federal power only when it was convenient to do so. Stampp also cited Confederate Vice President Alexander Stephens's A Constitutional View of the Late War Between the States as an example of a Southern leader who said that slavery was the "cornerstone of the Confederacy" when the war began but, after the Southern defeat, said that the war had been instead about states' rights.

According to an 1861 speech delivered by the Alabama politician Robert Hardy Smith, the State of Alabama declared its secession from the United States to preserve and to perpetuate the practice of slavery, the debate over which he referred to as the "Negro quarrel." In his speech, Smith praised the Confederate constitution for its lack of euphemisms and its succinct protections of the right to own "Negro" slaves:

The Georgia Democrat Alexander H. Stephens, who would become the Confederate vice president, stated within his Cornerstone Speech that the Confederate constitution was "decidedly better than" the American one, as the former "put at rest, forever, all the agitating questions relating to our peculiar institution. African slavery as it exists amongst us; the proper status of the negro in our form of civilization. This was the immediate cause of the late rupture and present revolution. Jefferson in his forecast, had anticipated this, as the 'rock upon which the old Union would split.' He was right."

See also
 List of national constitutions

References

Further reading

External links

 Confederate States Constitution at The Avalon Project
 Confederate States Constitution at the Hargrett Rare Book and Manuscript Library, University of Georgia
 Confederate States Constitution compared to the United States Constitution

1862 documents
1862 establishments in the Confederate States of America
1862 in American law
1865 disestablishments in the Confederate States of America
19th century in Montgomery, Alabama
Constitutions of the Confederate States of America
Confederate States
Legal history of the Confederate States of America
March 1861 events
Political charters
Provisional Congress of the Confederate States
University of Georgia